Daddy's Girls is an American reality television series on MTV. The series debuted on January 5, 2009 with the second season premiering on August 11, 2009.  The series follows Vanessa and Angela Simmons (oldest daughters of Joseph Simmons a.k.a. Rev Run), along with friends and family, as they start their new business and lives in Los Angeles.

The series is a spin-off of the series Run's House.

Cast History

Episodes

Season 1

Season 2

References

External links
 
 

2000s American reality television series
2009 American television series debuts
2009 American television series endings
MTV reality television series
English-language television shows
Television shows set in Los Angeles
American television spin-offs
Reality television spin-offs
Television series by Good Clean Fun (production company)
Women in Los Angeles